"Mega Mix" is a song by German Eurodance group Snap!. It was released as a single only and comprises the four previous singles taken from their first studio album, World Power (1990). The songs in order of the mega mix are; "Ooops Up", "The Power", "Cult of Snap", and "Mary Had a Little Boy". The song is included on their 1996 album, Snap! Attack: The Best of Snap!.

Chart performance
"Mega Mix" was a major hit on several continents. In Europe, it peaked at number one in Portugal and made it to the top 10 also in Denmark (number four), Finland (number two), the Netherlands, Spain, Switzerland and the United Kingdom. In the latter, the single peaked at number ten in its second week at the UK Singles Chart, on 31 March 1991. On the UK Dance Singles Chart, it reached number eight. Additionally, it was a top 20 hit in Belgium, Germany and Sweden, and a top 30 hit in Austria. Outside Europe, it reached number seven in New Zealand, number nine in Zimbabwe and number 25 in Australia.

Track listings
 7-inch single, Europe (1991)
 "Mega Mix" – 4:39	
 "Cult of Snap" (Cult's Dub Mosaic Meets Snap edit) – 4:26

 CD single, UK (1991)
 "Snap Mega Mix" (7-inch edit)
 "Cult's Dub" (Mosaic Meets Snap edit)
 "Snap Mega Mix"

 CD maxi, Germany (1991)
 "Snap Mega Mix" – 8:34
 "Cult's Dub" (Mosaic Meets Snap edit) – 6:26
 "Snap Mega Mix" (7-inch edit) – 4:39

Charts

Weekly charts

Year-end charts

References

1991 singles
1991 songs
Number-one singles in Portugal
English-language German songs
Snap! songs
Songs written by Charlie Wilson (singer)
Songs written by Lonnie Simmons
Songs written by Rudy Taylor